The Ford Mustang Mach 1 is a performance-oriented option package of the Ford Mustang muscle car, originally introduced in August 1968 for the 1969 model year. It was available until 1978, returned briefly in 2003, 2004, and most recently in 2021.

As part of a Ford heritage program, the Mach 1 package returned in 2003 as a high-performance version of the New Edge platform. Visual connections to the 1969 model were integrated into the design to pay homage to the original. This generation of the Mach 1 was discontinued after the 2004 model year, with the introduction of the fifth generation Mustang.

Ford first used the name "Mach 1" in its 1969 display of a concept called the "Levacar Mach I" at the Ford Rotunda. This concept vehicle used a cushion of air as propulsion on a circular dais.

Introduction 
The Ford Mustang was successfully introduced in April 1964 as a sporty pony car to attract younger buyers to Ford products. After a few years of development, Ford saw the need to create performance Mustangs to compete with GM and their release of the Chevrolet Camaro and Pontiac Firebird.

As the performance war continued, the Mustang's platform and engine bay were progressively redesigned to accommodate larger engine blocks. Late in the 1968 model year, Ford introduced the 428 cu in (7.0 L) Cobra Jet FE engine in a small group of Mustang GTs and into the 1968 Shelby GT500KR. This was a strong performer and indicated the direction of the 1969 Mustang. However, "GT" was deemed insufficient to describe performance, thus the Mach 1 model name was introduced.

First generation (1969–1970) 

The 1969 Ford Mustang featured numerous performance-themed model names and engines. Six factory performance Mustang models were available (GT, Boss 302, Boss 429, Shelby GT350, Shelby GT500, and the Mach 1). Additionally, seven variations of V8s were available in the 1969 through 1973 models; most of these were also available in the new Mach 1.

Due to the Mach 1's success, the GT model was discontinued after 1969 following poor sales of 5,396 units versus the 72,458 sales for the Mach 1. The Mustang would not wear the "GT" badge again until 1982.

The Mach 1 package was only available in the "SportsRoof" fastback body style (previously known as the 'fastback'); never on the hardtop or convertible. Many resto-mod visual conversions have since been performed by owners and enthusiasts, but are not Mach 1's by VIN code.

All first-generation Mach 1's are distinguished by the body style code 63C on the door data plate.

The Mach 1 started with a V8-powered SportsRoof body and added visual and performance-enhancing items such as matte black hood treatment with hood pins, hood scoop (including optional Shaker scoop), competition suspension, chrome pop-open gas cap, revised wheels with Goodyear Polyglas tires, chrome exhaust tips (except 351W 2V), deluxe interior, livery and dealer optional chin spoiler, rear deck spoiler, and rear window louvers (SportSlats).

Standard equipment was a 351 cu in (5.8 L) Windsor (351W) 2V engine with a 3-speed manual transmission, and a  28 spline open rear axle. A 351W 4V was optional as was a 390 cu in (6.4 L) FE, and the 428 cu in (7.0 L) Cobra Jet 4V with or without Ram Air, and even the introduction of the "drag pack" option with the modified 428 cu in (7.0 L) Super Cobra Jet engine. A 4-speed manual or 3-speed FMX (small block)/C6 (big block) automatic transmission was optional, and the 428SCJ added a cast iron tailshaft in place of the regular aluminum one to the C6. A "traction lok" rear axle was optional, and the 428 CJ/SCJ included a "traction lok" with a 3.91 or 4.30 ratio, 31 spline axle shafts, and a nodular case. In 1970, the 3.91 ratio was a "traction-lok", while the 4.30 ratio was a Detroit Locker.

Mach 1s came with upgraded suspension to varying degrees dependent upon powertrain choices. Big block cars had front shock tower reinforcement, thicker sway bars (no rear bar for 1969), and heavier springs and shocks. 428 CJ/SCJ 4-speed cars also came with staggered rear shocks. Standard on Mach 1s was a fierce but cosmetic hood scoop that had integrated turn-signal lights mounted in the back. A more functional option was the signature "Shaker hood", an air scoop mounted directly to the top of the engine, used to collect fresh air and so named for its tendency to "shake" with the V8 engine. The interior came complete with teak wood grain details, full sound-deadening material, and high-back sport bucket seats.

In 1968 racecar drivers Mickey Thompson and Danny Ongais took three Mach 1 Mustangs to the Bonneville salt flats for a feature in Hot Rod magazine, in the process setting 295 speed and endurance records over a series of 500-mile and 24-hour courses.

Ford kept the Mach 1 in production into 1970 and little changed other than the visuals. The 1970 body included dual-beam headlights with the previous inner headlights becoming sport lamps and recessed taillights on a black honeycomb rear panel, side scoops behind both doors removed, revised bucket seats, deep dish sports wheel covers, as well as new side and rear badging and striping were the main visual differences. The 1970 model year Ford did use the Windsor 2v motor on some earlier built cars until the new 351 cu in (5.8 L) Cleveland (351C) V8 in either 2V (for use with 2-venturi carbs) or 4V (for use with 4-venturi carbs) versions were used exclusively. The 351C 4V (M code) engine featured 11.0:1 compression and produced  at 5400 rpm. This new engine incorporated elements learned from the Ford 385 series engine and the Boss 302, particularly the poly-angle combustion chambers with canted valves and the thin-wall casting technology.

Engines

First generation Mustang Facelift (1971–1973) 

For 1971, Ford reduced the content of the Mach 1. The standard features of the model were as follows:

 SportsRoof body style with unique "05" VIN code & "63R" body code on the door tag
 Color-keyed urethane front "spoiler" bumper & front fender and hood trim
 Honeycomb grille in black w/sportlamps
 Argent or black "Mach 1 – MUSTANG" decals on fenders
 Argent or black stripe and "Mach 1" decal on the trunk lid
 Argent or black lower body accent paint
 Bright trim at lower body paint line
 E70-14 white sidewall tires w/ hub caps & trim rings on 7" wide steel wheels
 Color-keyed dual racing mirror w/driver side remote
 Honeycomb taillight panel applique with bright trim
 Unique pop-open gas cap
 F-code 302-2V engine w/3 speed manual transmission
 Competition Suspension (HD springs & shocks), variable quick-ratio steering box if ordered with P/S
 Base Mustang vinyl interior
 Flat hood – the NACA scooped hood was a no-cost OPTION for the base engine

In 1971, the Mach 1 was available with three 351 Cleveland engines; the H-code 2-V, the M-code 4-V, and beginning in May 1971, the Q-code 351CJ (Cobra Jet or GT engine). M & Q code engines were produced concurrently up until the end of 71 model year production. There were also two 429ci options, the C-code CJ (Cobra Jet) & J-code CJ-R (Cobra Jet – Ram Air). Buying the optional "Drag Pak" 3.91 (V) or 4.11 (Y) rear gears turned either 429 into a "Super Cobra Jet", with a solid lifter cam, Holley 780cfm carb and special rotating assembly with forged pistons.

One of the most recognizable features of the '71–'73 Mach 1s is the hood design with dual scoops. The hood was a no-cost option on the 302 cars and standard on all others. The basic hood had non-functional NACA ducts, but when ordered with the Ram Air option, it became functional. The Ram Air option included a vacuum-controlled door inside each scoop, and a fiberglass under-hood 'plenum' that directed cool, outside air through a modified, rubber-ringed air filter housing and into the carburetor. The ram-air option also included a pair of 1970 Mach1-style chrome twist hood locks and a two-tone hood paint treatment in either 'matte black' or 'argent' (matte silver), which coordinated with the decals and striping. The option also received either a "351 RAM AIR" or "429 RAM AIR" decal on each side of the hood, depending upon the engine ordered.

In 1972, the 429CJ & SCJ engines were dropped from the lineup, and horsepower ratings dropped across the board due to the switch to new SAE net horsepower calculations and a 4-degree camshaft retard built into the timing set. This year also produced the fewest Mach 1 sales of the 1971–73 generation. There are no major differences in the '71 and '72 Mach 1s externally. The 1972 Mach 1 also saw the deletion of the pop-open gas cap, which was replaced with the standard twist-on cap found on the other Mustang models that year. The 302 Windsor remained as the base Mach 1 engine. There were again three 351 Cleveland engine options for 1972. A 2-barrel, the 4-barrel 351CJ, and a new for '72 R-code 351HO, essentially a lower compression Boss 351 engine.

The Mach 1 received some significant appearance updates for 1973. The lower body accent paint and bright trim were gone and the entire car was one color from top to bottom. All 1973 Mach 1s received a wide body-side tape stripe in either black or argent, that featured a "MACH 1" cutout on the front of the quarter panel, and a standard "MUSTANG" script emblem on the fender. The deck lid tape stripe was revised, with the "MACH 1" lettering now incorporated into the passenger side of the stripe, instead of centered above it as in 1971 and 1972. The valance cutouts and bright tips were no longer available on 4V cars for 1973.

The Mustang needed to comply with new NHTSA standards, which necessitated a redesigned front and rear bumper. The front bumper on all models was now a much larger body-colored urethane unit, mounted on impact-absorbing struts. Due to the revised bumper, the Mach 1 sport lamps were deleted and all models had the park/turn signal lamps moved from the front valance up to a vertical orientation at each end of the grille. The Mach 1 grille was black with a honeycomb pattern and a small running horse tri-bar emblem. The rear bumper was mounted on extended brackets which caused the bumper to protrude from the body further and yielded a large gap. To rectify this, Ford used a body-colored urethane filler piece at each quarter panel, and a sheetmetal filler panel bolted to the taillight panel.

Engine options remained virtually the same as in 1972, with the exception of the 351HO being dropped. The 351-4V was not advertised in the '73 Mustang as a Cobra Jet engine even though the 1973 Ford shop manual and other internal Ford documentation did reference the engine as the 351-4V CJ since the "Cobra Jet" nomenclature did continue on in Torino, Cougar, and Montego lines.

Due to trouble getting the Ram Air option approved for emissions reasons, the 351-2V was the only engine available with Ram Air. New for 1973, Ford offered a "Tu-Tone" hood paint treatment option that consisted of the black or argent paint treatment and twist locks, but without the actual functional components of the Ram Air system.

Engines 
The chart does not reflect the Boss 351 variant of the 351 Cleveland or 250cid I6, as neither were available in the Mach 1 package.

The 1972 R-code 351HO package – essentially the solid-lifter Boss 351 engine from 1971 with a reduction in compression from 11.0:1 to 8.8:1 – is listed here, as it was available with the Mach 1 package that year.

Second generation (1974–1978) 

The Mach 1 name continued with the advent of the Mustang II in 1974. The downsized vehicle – fitted with the 2.8 L V6 rated at  – outsold the Mach 1 models of the previous four years. For model years 1975 through 1978, the high-performance package was renamed "Cobra II".

Also available was a 4-speed manual.

The Mach 1 remained mostly unchanged in 1976, as a new performance model – the Cobra II – was introduced alongside. 1977 proved to be the weakest sales year of the Mach 1 to date, selling only 6,719 units. The nameplate remained for one more year, upon when it was discontinued with the advent of the third generation Mustang in 1979.

Fourth generation (2003–2004) 

During the 1990s, the preeminent performance Mustang was the SVT Cobra. Following the departure of the Fox chassis in 1993 and the arrival of the SN-95 in 1994, Ford also sought to eliminate the 302, which would not occur until the 1996 model. Drawing on its newly developed OHC architecture engines known as the Modular, SVT created the 1996 and up Cobra around several variations of the 32 valve, all-aluminum 4.6 liter (281 CID) V8. The 32-valve 4.6 L V8 used in the Mustang Mach 1 was originally introduced in the 1993 Lincoln Mark VIII, however, for the Mach 1, it was re-engineered with a free-flowing exhaust and intake manifold to increase the engine by 30 horsepower. Below the SVT in performance was only the GT, reintroduced in 1982 with the 302 HO "5.0", later turning to the 16-valve SOHC V-8 in 1996. The sales on the new SN-95 style cars increased, so that by 2002, Mustang sales topped the combined sales figure of the Firebird and the Camaro. With GM's withdrawal from the "Pony Car wars" in 2002, Ford had a free hand at the whole market but nonetheless created what was arguably the fastest stock Mustang up to that point in time with the 2003–2004 SVT Cobra. However, concerns over a price gap between the GT and Cobra, as well as interest in keeping sales up before the release of the all-new 2005 S197 Mustang prompted the creation of two unique mid-range performance models: The 2001½ Bullitt GT and the 2003 and 2004 Mach 1 both credited to Team Mustang led by Art Hyde and Scott Hoag.

Following the stir caused by the retro 2001 "Bullitt" (a lightly modified 2001 GT, named for the famed chase Mustang driven by Steve McQueen in the film Bullitt) Ford saw the value of heritage in the Mustang name and as a follow-up, sought to revive the Mach 1 name. While similar to the Bullitt in the use of the Cobra's  Brembo front brake rotors, unique Tokico gas shocks and struts, and lower and stiffer springs, the Mach 1 received a huge performance gain over the base GT and even the  Bullitt in the form of a unique variant of the DOHC 32-valve 4.6 L Modular V8. Commonly known by Mach 1 owners as an "R" code DOHC, (for the unique VIN engine R code) this all-aluminum engine features the same high flow heads as the 2003–2004 SVT Cobra, 2003–2004 Mercury Marauder, 2003–2005 Lincoln Aviator, and the 2003–2009 Australian Boss 5.4 L V8s (see Ford of Australia Boss 5.4 L), the engine also has intake camshafts sourced from Lincoln's 5.4 L "InTech" V8 to provide more mid-range torque. The Mach 1 engine had a 10.1:1 compression ratio in contrast to the 1999 and 2001 Cobra's 9.85:1, and the Mach 1 was equipped with a Windsor Aluminum Plant or WAP block unique from the Teksid aluminum blocks used in the 1996–1999 Cobras. The Mach 1 also featured a relatively high redline of 6,800 rpm (5-speed cars) and fuel cut off at 7,050 rpm or 5800 rpm (4-speed automatic). While on paper the 305 hp (228 kW) ratings seem a loss when compared to the 1999 and 2001 SVT Cobras which produced 320 hp (239 kW), in practice the Mach 1 engine produced similar peak horsepower and substantially more torque.

Further differences included the use of Ford's  solid rear axle with a 3.55 final ratio (As opposed to SVT's Independent Rear Suspension) also the availability of a 4-speed automatic in addition to the Tremec sourced 5-speed manual. Factory steel "Box" cross-section subframe connectors were also added to increase chassis strength for both the added handling and to deal with the prodigious torque over the stock GT. Style-wise, the Mach 1 was distinct from other Mustangs as it drew heavily from the 1970 Mach 1. In addition to the matte black spoiler and hood stripe, flat black chin spoiler, Mach 1 rocker panel stripes, and Mach 1 badging on the rear, there were also faux Magnum 500 polished 17×8-inch alloy wheels. A retro-themed interior was included with well-bolstered dark grey leather seats featuring 1970s style "Comfort Weave" textures, a 1970s style gauge cluster, and a machined aluminum shift ball. An optional 18G interior upgrade package included stainless steel pedals, a 4-way head restraint, aluminum finished shift boot trim ring and door lock posts, and aluminum-look bezels on the dash. The most noticeable difference visually from other Mustangs was the bulging hood with cut-out and the return of a semi-legitimate "Shaker Hood". While physically identical in placement and function (the scoop is said to be built on the same tooling as the 1970 Mach 1) it only provides a portion of air to the engine routing to the airbox ahead of the MAF. It does function well as a cold air "snorkel" and a partial Ram Air at speed.

2004 saw only minor cosmetic changes to the Mach 1. 2004 Mach 1s can be identified by bare aluminum finished valve covers, as opposed to the 2003's black finished covers. Outside, 2004 Mach 1's have 40th-anniversary tags ahead of the doors while the 2003 has the traditional Mustang Running Pony and Tri-Color bar. The lone interior change was the deletion of the overhead "cargo net" mounted on the headliner. Despite pre-production rumors, the horsepower and torque ratings were not increased in 2004.

The 2003 Mach 1 was originally offered in Black, Dark Shadow Grey Metallic, Torch Red, Zinc Yellow, and Oxford White, as well as Azure Blue that was exclusive to the Mach 1. For 2004 Zinc Yellow was replaced with a more vibrant yellow called Screaming Yellow, as well as adding a new color, Competition Orange.

With improvements in power and a relatively light curb weight of 3,380 lb (1,533 kg), the 2003 Mustang Mach 1 posted magazine test numbers that were impressive given its $29,305 price tag. All this while maintaining a decent  on a  slalom and 0.85 gs on the skidpad, though the higher CG of the larger DOHC engine has created a tendency to understeer more than the IRS equipped SVTs and lower CG and lower curb weight Bullitt GTs with the same basic suspension and brakes.

Limited in production, the 2003 and 2004 Mach 1s ended with the New Edge body platform, the discontinuation of the Fox framed unibody, and the introduction of the first new frame design since 1979 the s-197 with 9,652 2003's and 7,182 2004's being built, contrary to the Mach 1 originally being advertised as a one-year limited run model with production set at 6,500 cars.

Sixth generation (2021–2023) 

The 2022 model produces 470 hp and 410 lb-ft at 4,600 rpm, which is a loss of 10 hp and 10 lb-ft of torque. Ford engineers were originally targeting 525 hp (391 kW) and 450 lb⋅ft (610 N⋅m). It borrows several parts from the Shelby models: the intake manifold, oil-filter adapter, engine oil cooler, and front and rear subframe are shared with the Shelby GT350, while the rear axle cooling system, rear toe link, and rear diffuser are shared with the Shelby GT500. On the front grille, at each side of the pony badge there are two large vent holes.

“Mach 1 performance is evident even before you get behind the wheel. Its streamlined design and exterior styling cues celebrate Mach 1 heritage dating back more than five decades. Sure, every Mustang looks good in the driveway, but the Mach 1 was made to shine on the track. The unique handling dynamics and an available Mach 1 Handling Package help you feel stuck to the road, around curves and when you’re hitting the straightaway at a 168 mph max speed. Better yet, it’s completely customizable in appearance, powertrain and performance, so you can put your spin on this icon.”

References

External links 

Ford Mustang
Muscle cars
Coupés
Rear-wheel-drive vehicles
Cars introduced in 1969
1970s cars
2000s cars
2020s cars